The 1938 Nobel Prize in Literature was awarded to the American author Pearl S. Buck (1892–1973) "for her rich and truly epic descriptions of peasant life in China and for her biographical masterpieces." Buck was the first female American to be awarded the Nobel Prize and the third American recipient following Eugene O'Neill in 1936 and Sinclair Lewis in 1930. She was also the fourth woman to receive the prize.

Laureate 

Pearl Buck's first novel, East Wind: West Wind, was published in 1930, which narrates about a Chinese woman, Kwei-lan, and the changes that she and her family undergo. It was followed then by trilogy that brought her major literary breakthrough: The Good Earth (1931), Sons (1932), and A House Divided (1935), which is a saga about the Wang family. The books were highly acclaimed and very popular during the 1930s receiving other literary prizes such as the 1932 Pulitzer Prize for Fiction. The recurring theme in Buck's many novels is everyday life in China wherein she describes a rich gallery of characters, trapped between tradition and modernity.

Deliberations

Nominations
Pearl Buck had not been nominated before for the prize, making her one of the laureates who won on a rare occasion when they have been awarded the Nobel Prize in Literature the same year they were first nominated. She received 4 four nominations all from members of the Swedish Academy.

In total, the academy received 47 nominations for 29 individuals, among them the American novelist Margaret Mitchell, Finnish writer Frans Eemil Sillanpää (awarded in 1939), Danish writer Johannes V. Jensen (awarded in 1944), Hermann Hesse (awarded in 1946), Czech author Karel Čapek, Norwegian writer Johan Falkberget, British author Aldous Huxley, Greek poet Kostis Palamas, Croatian author Ivana Brlić-Mažuranić, Italian philosopher Benedetto Croce, and Finnish writer Sally Salminen.

The authors Lascelles Abercrombie, Samuel Alexander, Serafín Álvarez Quintero, Alexander Amfiteatrov, Ernst Barlach, Nagendranath Basu, Rudolf G. Binding, Sarat Chandra Chattopadhyay, Gabriele D'Annunzio, Isabelo de los Reyes, C. J. Dennis, Paola Drigo, Zona Gale, Edmund Husserl, Muhammad Iqbal, Aleksandr Ivanovich Kuprin, Leopoldo Lugones, Osip Mandelstam, Momčilo Nastasijević, Henry Newbolt, Millosh Gjergj Nikolla (known as Migjeni), Branislav Nušić, Olivia Shakespear, William Stern, Alfonsina StorniCésar Vallejo, Owen Wister and Thomas Wolfe died in 1938 without having been nominated for the prize. Croatian writer Ivana Brlić-Mažuranić died weeks before the announcement.

Reception 

In 1938, the Nobel Prize committee in awarding the prize said:

In her speech to the academy, she took as her topic "The Chinese Novel." She explained, "I am an American by birth and by ancestry", but "my earliest knowledge of story, of how to tell and write stories, came to me in China." After an extensive discussion of classic Chinese novels, especially Romance of the Three Kingdoms, All Men Are Brothers, and Dream of the Red Chamber, she concluded that in China "the novelist did not have the task of creating art but of speaking to the people." Her own ambition, she continued, had not been trained toward "the beauty of letters or the grace of art." In China, the task of the novelist differed from the Western artist: "To farmers he must talk of their land, and to old men he must speak of peace, and to old women he must tell of their children, and to young men and women he must speak of each other." And like the Chinese novelist, she concluded, "I have been taught to want to write for these people. If they are reading their magazines by the million, then I want my stories there rather than in magazines read only by a few."

Reactions 
The 1938 Nobel Prize is one of the most criticized in the prize's history because Buck's later works generally were not considered to be of the literary standard of a Nobel laureate. According to novelist Irving Wallace, he was told by Sven Hedin that Buck "scarcely bowled over the academy". Ten of the eighteen members voted against her, but Hedin and Selma Lagerlöf later changed their minds thus awarding her the prize.

The American literary critic Norman Holmes Pearson referred to the Swedish Academy's choice as reducing the Nobel to the "hammish" level of the Pulitzer Prize and commented: "Thank heavens I have seen no one who has taken it seriously." Referring to Buck's widely quoted comment when she received the Nobel news – "I don't believe it... That's ridiculous. It should have gone to Dreiser" – Pearson responded: "Nuts to her, say I, I think that was putting it mildly." Lists of American writers besides Theodore Dreiser whom contemporaries mentioned as more deserving of the Nobel than Pearl Buck included Henry James, Sherwood Anderson, Willa Cather, and John Dos Passos.

Notes

References

External links 
 Award ceremony speech by Per Hallström nobelprize.org
 The Nobel Prize Award Ceremony 1938 nobelprize.org

1938
Pearl S. Buck